Kalteva Torni ( The Leaning Tower), is a 2006 Finnish comedy film, directed by Timo Koivusalo. It was premiered in Finland on 20 October 2006.

The leading roles are played by Martti Suosalo, Seela Sella, Liisa Kuoppamäki, Siiri Suosalo, Esko Nikkari, Mats Långbacka, Laura Jurkka, Jemina Sillanpää and Risto Salmi.

It is the story of a benevolent man who does not know he has multiple personalities. His greatest fear is that he will not be able to see the Leaning Tower of Pisa before it falls. His adventures lead him into tricky situations and, eventually, he does see it.

External links 
 

2006 films
2000s Finnish-language films
2006 comedy films
Films directed by Timo Koivusalo
Finnish comedy films